Jacob Ferdinand Voet or Jakob Ferdinand Voet ( 163926 September 1689) was a Flemish portrait painter. He had an international career that brought him to Italy and France, where he made portraits for an elite clientele. Voet is regarded as one of the best and most fashionable portrait painters of the High Baroque.

Life

Few details about Voet's early life, training and career have been preserved. Voet was born in Antwerp as the son of the painter Elias Voet. He was one of the fifteen children; his older brother Carlo moved to Amsterdam and married in 1661 a daughter of the wealthy Joan Coymans and Sophia Trip. Jacob left his native Antwerp and travelled to Rome where he resided from 1663 to 1680.  Voet became a member of the Bentvueghels, an association of mainly Dutch and Flemish artists active in Rome.  Voet drew a picture in charcoal of all the members of the Bentvueghels on the white-washed wall of an inn in Rome that was a popular meeting place of this group.  The picture was treasured enough to be spared whenever the walls were repainted.

In Rome Voet's skills as a portrait painter were much in demand at the Papal court and by the Roman aristocracy, including the prominent Colonna and Odescalchi families. He was patronised by Christina, Queen of Sweden, who was then resident in Rome.  He painted her portrait as well as that of her friend, Cardinal Azzolino. Englishmen and other Europeans visiting Rome on their Grand Tour also commissioned portraits from Voet.

In 1671–1672 Voet received a commission from Cardinal Chigi to paint portraits of young woman who were prominent in Roman society.  He created a first series of 37 portraits of the most enchanting women of Rome ('Galleria delle Belle') between 1672 and 1678 for Cardinal Chigi's dining room in his palace in Ariccia (in the Alban hills outside Rome). He later copied and even enlarged the series for other Roman and Italian noble families. This started a rage for portraits of young women in Rome and abroad.In Rome Voet lived with the painter-engraver Cornelis Bloemaert. He was banned from the city by Pope Innocent XI who was scandalized by Voet's portraits of women portrayed with unseemly décolleté.  He left Rome and is recorded in Milan in 1680.  He was in Florence in 1681 where he worked for the Medici family. Subsequently, he resided in Turin from 1682 to 1684.   He returned to Antwerp in 1684. According to the 18th century biographer Arnold Houbraken, Voet set out on his return journey to Antwerp from Turin together with the Dutch painter Jan van Bunnik, whom he had already met in Rome in the company of Cornelis Bloemaert. From Turin they set out for Lyons, where they met the painters Adriaen van der Cabel, Pieter van Bloemen, and Gillis Wenix. They then started out for Paris in the company of a third painter, Jacob van Bunnik who was Jan van Bunnik's brother.

Voet was likely back in Antwerp in 1684. He left his hometown for Paris at some time between 1684 and 1686, was appointed as court painter and died there in 1689, living on Quai de Guénégaud. In Paris he became portrait painter to political and military personalities such as Michel Le Tellier, François-Michel le Tellier and Marquis of Humières. Jacques d'Agar was probably his pupil.

Work
Jacob Ferdinand Voet was a specialist portrait painter.  The early Dutch biographer Houbraken noted that Voet painted history paintings and landscapes, but that it was through his royal, ecclesiastical and class portraits that he secured his success. Only portrait paintings and not a single history or landscape painting are currently attributed to him.

Voet specialized in half-length portraits, in which all attention is concentrated on the subject, who emerges from a neutral, dark background. Voet's subjects usually have a reflective expression and very striking, memorable eyes, always large and evocative. He concentrated on decorative elements such as the hair and clothing of the characters. His paintings appear to have been executed with an effortless accuracy and a fluid ease. He was also noted as a painter of miniature portraits.

It is likely that the works of the portrait painters Carlo Maratta (1625–1713) and Pierre Mignard (1612–1695) who were active in Rome at the same time as Voet inspired the comparable elegance of his style, which he combined with the Flemish attention to detail.

Voet painted a few portraits in a genre that was popular in Flanders at the time: the portrait in garland paintings.  Garland paintings are a special type of still life developed in Antwerp by artists such as Jan Brueghel the Elder, Hendrick van Balen, Frans Francken the Younger, Peter Paul Rubens and Daniel Seghers. They typically show a flower garland around a devotional image or portrait.  Garland paintings were usually collaborations between a still life and a figure painter.<ref name=garland>[http://www.hnanews.org/archive/2012/11/vl_merriam0912.html Ursula Härting, Review of Susan Merriam, Seventeenth-Century Flemish Garland Paintings. Still Life, Vision and the Devotional Image]</ref> Close collaboration between artists with different specialities was also a common practice in Rome.

There are two portrait paintings attributed to Voet that use the portrait in a garland device.  They are portraits of women, one in a garland of flowers, the other in a garland of fruit.  The Portrait of a lady, traditionally identified as a member of the Colonna family was originally in the Colonna collection and as a result it is believed it depicts a member of the Colonna family (Auctioned at Christie's on 29 October 2015 in London, lot 99).  As in other garland paintings, the garland can be seen as carrying various symbolic connotations. The flowers allude to the sitter's beauty and youth, which are in full bloom.  A branch of lilies, depicted in the upper right, refers to her chastity.

Voet's works were widely disseminated through copies by the Roman painter Pietro Veglia and engravings by the Flemish engraver Albertus Clouwet.  The Roman publisher Giovanni Giacomo Rossi included Voet's portraits of Cardinals in the publication Effigies Cardinalium nunc viventum.

 References and notes

 Bibliography 
Francesco Petrucci, Ferdinand Voet (1639–1689) detto Ferdinando de' Ritratti, Ugo Bozzi Editore, Roma 2005 
Francesco Petrucci, exhibition catalog Ferdinand Voet. Ritrattista di Corte tra Roma e l’Europa del Seicento, Roma, Castel Sant’Angelo, De Luca Editori, Roma 2005
Francesco Petrucci, Pittura di Ritratto a Roma. Il Seicento, 3 voll., Andreina & Valneo Budai Editori, Roma 2008, ad indicem
Francesco Petrucci, Ferdinand Voet. Ritratto di Pietro Banchieri in veste di "bella"'', in "Quaderni del Barocco", 6, Ariccia 2009

External links

1639 births
1700 deaths
Artists from Antwerp
Flemish Baroque painters
Flemish portrait painters
Members of the Bentvueghels
Court painters